Jacob John Glossbrenner (1812–1887) was since 1845 the fourteenth Bishop of the Church of the United Brethren in Christ.

Birth and family
Jacob John Glossbrenner was born 24 July 1812 in Hagerstown, Maryland.  His parents were Lutheran.  His father was killed by an accident when Jacob was only seven years old.  His mother and he and his three siblings were left in very straitened circumstances.  Jacob was therefore apprenticed to a silversmith to learn his trade.

Conversion and call
Jacob was converted to evangelical Christianity at the age of seventeen.  This changed the current of his life.  A year later he was Licensed to Exhort in the United Brethren Church.  Another year, when only nineteen, he became an itinerant preacher.

See also
List of bishops of the United Methodist Church

References

Behney, J. Bruce and Eller, Paul H., The History of the Evangelical United Brethren Church, (edited by Kenneth W. Krueger), Nashville, Abingdon, 1979.
Koontz, Paul Rodes, and Roush, Walter Edwin, The Bishops:  Church of the United Brethren in Christ, Dayton, Ohio:  The Otterbein Press, 1950.
Drury, Rev. A. W., The Life of Bishop J. J. Glossbrenner, D. D. of the United Brethren in Christ, Dayton, Ohio: United Brethren, 1889 FAIL WHALE 

1812 births
1887 deaths
Bishops of the Church of the United Brethren in Christ
American United Brethren in Christ
People from Hagerstown, Maryland
Converts to evangelical Christianity
Ministers of the Evangelical United Brethren Church
19th-century American bishops